Inverness West is one of the 21 wards used to elect members of the Highland Council.  It includes Kinmylies and Scorguie areas of urban Inverness, and a more rural area, west of the River Ness. It elects three Councillors.

Councillors

Election Results

2022 Election
2022 Highland Council election

2021 By-election
A by-election was triggered by the resignation of Graham Ross for family reasons.

2017 Election
2017 Highland Council election

2012 Election
2012 Highland Council election

2009 By-election

2007 Election
2007 Highland Council election

References

Highland council wards
Inverness